Kenneth E. Rinaldo (born 1958) is an American neo-conceptual artist and arts educator, known for his interactive robotics, 3D animation, and BioArt installations.  His works include Autopoiesis (2000), and Augmented Fish Reality (2004), a fish-driven robot.

Biography

Rinaldo was born in Queens and raised in Long Island. He attended Ward Melville High School in East Setauket, New York. He moved to California and earned an Associate of Science degree in Computer Science from Cañada College, 1982. He went on to earn a Bachelor of Arts in Communications from The University of California, Santa Barbara; 1984 and a Master of Fine Arts in Conceptual Information Arts from San Francisco State University, 1996. At San Francisco State he studied with artists Steve Wilson, Brian Rogers, George LeGrady and Paul DeMarinis.

In 2000 he received the first prize at the VIDA 3.0 International Artificial Life Competition for Autopoiesis; in 2001 the same piece received an honorable mention at the Ars Electronica Festival. In 2004 Rinaldo's Augmented Fish Reality, a fish-driven robot, won an award of distinction at the same festival.
In 2020 he was selected for the 2020 edition of The New Art Fest, an annual art and technology festival in Lisbon.

Rinaldo directs the Art and Technology Program in the Department of Art at Ohio State University.

References

Further reading 
 Aloi, Giovanni. (2012) Art and Animals. London: Tauris.  p. 108. 
 BEAP: Biennale of Electronic Arts Perth. (2002). Australia: John Curtin Gallery, Curtin University of Technology. 
 Brouwer, Joke. (2010) The Politics of the Impure. Rotterdam: NAI. p. 47. 
 Jones, Amelia. (2006) A Companion to Contemporary Art Since 1945. Malden (MA): Blackwell Publishing. p. 575. 
 Jones, Noa. (2007) Art in Action: nature, creativity and our collective future. San Rafael: Earth Aware Editions. 
 Ohlenschläger, Karin. (2012) Vida 1999-2012: arte y vida artificial = art and artificial life. Madrid: Fundación Telefónica. 
 Parikka, Jussi. (2010) Insect Media: An Archaeology of Animals and Technology. Minneapolis: University of Minnesota Press. p. 134. 
 Poissant, Louise, and Daubner, Ernestine. (2005) Art et biotechnologies. Sainte-Foy (Québec): Presses de l'Université du Québec. 
 Preziosi, Donald. (2007) The Art of Art History: A Critical Anthology. Oxford [u.a.]: Oxford Univ. Press. 
 Reichle, Ingeborg. (2009). Art in the Age of Technoscience: Genetic Engineering, Robotics, and Artificial Life in Contemporary Art. Wien: Springer. 
 Robots and Art: Exploring an Unlikely Symbiosis. (2016). Singapore: Springer Singapore. 
 Scarinzi, Alfonsina. (2016) Aesthetics and the embodied mind: beyond art theory and the cartesian mind-body dichotomy. Dordrecht: Springer Netherlands. 
 Seevinck, J. (2017). Emergence in Interactive Art. Germany: Springer International Publishing. p. 54. 
 Shanken, Edward A. (2014). Art and Electronic Media. London: Phaidon Press Limited. 
 *Whitelaw, Mitchell. (2004) Metacreation: Art and Artificial Life. Cambridge, Mass: MIT Press. 
 Shanken, Edward A. (2015). Systems. London: Whitechapel Gallery. 
 Whitelaw, M. (2004). Metacreation: art and artificial life. Cambridge: MIT Press. 
 Wilson, Stephen. (2003) Information Arts: Intersections of Art, Science, and Technology. Cambridge, Massachusetts: The MIT press. p. 113.

External links
 Artists Web Site
 Artist's biography, YLEM web site

Ohio State University faculty
American installation artists
1958 births
Living people
Robotic art
BioArtists
University of California, Santa Barbara alumni
New media artists
Ward Melville High School alumni